Hog Creek may refer to:

Hog Creek (Crooked Creek tributary), a stream in Missouri
Hog Creek (Ottawa River tributary), a stream in Ohio